Riddick may refer to:

Entertainment
 Riddick (film), a 2013 film
 Riddick (character), the protagonist of The Chronicles of Riddick franchise

Places
 Riddick House (disambiguation), three houses on the US National Register of Historic Places
 Riddick Stadium, North Carolina, US, former home of the North Carolina State University football team

People with the given name
 Riddick Bowe (born 1967), American boxer
 Riddick Parker (1972–2022), American football player

People with the surname
 Andre Riddick (born 1973), American professional basketball player
 Carl W. Riddick (1872–1960), member of the US House of Representatives for Montana
 Floyd M. Riddick (1908–2000), Parliamentarian of the US Senate from 1964 to 1974
 Gordon Riddick (born 1943), English former professional football player 
 Graham Riddick (born 1955), British Member of Parliament from 1987 to 1997
 Joseph Riddick (1735–1818), Speaker of the North Carolina Senate and former member of the North Carolina House of Representatives
 Kathleen Riddick (1907-1973), British conductor and cellist
 Lance Riddick (born 1962), American actor
 Louis Riddick (born 1969), retired American National Football League safety
 Makeba Riddick, American singer and songwriter
 Ray Riddick (1917-1976), American National Football League player 
 Robb Riddick (born 1957), retired American National Football League running back
 Steve Riddick (born 1951), American Olympic gold medalist in the 4x100 meter relay
 Theo Riddick (born 1991), American football running back
 W. C. Riddick (1864-1942), American football coach and college administrator
 Walter Garrett Riddick (1883–1953), US federal judge

See also
 Readick